The winners of the 2018 IndieWire Critics Poll were announced on December 17, 2018.

Winners and nominees

References

Indiewire Critics' Poll
Indiewire Critics' Poll